Robert Bishop Fiske Jr. (born December 28, 1930) is an American trial attorney and a partner with the law firm of Davis Polk & Wardwell in New York City.  He was the United States Attorney for the Southern District of New York from 1976 to 1980 after earlier having served as an assistant in the office from 1957 to 1961.

Special prosecutor
Attorney General Janet Reno appointed Fiske as the special prosecutor to investigate the Whitewater controversy and the death of White House Counsel Vince Foster in January 1994. At the time of his appointment, Fiske was universally praised by Republicans.

Fiske conducted investigations, and released an interim report on June 30 that in summary concluded that President Bill Clinton and White House officials had not interfered with the Resolution Trust Corporation, which was investigating the failed Madison Guaranty Savings & Loan, a partner of the Whitewater Development Corporation. Fiske's report also concluded that Vince Foster died by suicide. On the same day that Fiske released this report, President Clinton signed the Independent Counsel Reauthorization Act of 1994, effectively abolishing the position of Special Prosecutor and replacing it with the position of Independent Counsel. Under the new law, the Special Division had sole authority to select Independent Counsels.

Janet Reno formally requested that Robert Fiske be chosen, and allowed to continue his investigation. On August 5, the Special Division, headed by Judge David Sentelle of the United States Court of Appeals for the District of Columbia Circuit, decided to replace Fiske with former Washington D.C. Circuit judge Kenneth Starr.

Private practice 
Fiske is a senior law partner at Davis Polk, where he has represented many high-profile clients. He defended the National Football League in an antitrust suit brought by the United States Football League. He represented Clark Clifford and Robert A. Altman, who were top executives of First American bank until they stepped down facing investigations by regulators and prosecutors regarding their roles in the BCCI scandal.

He headed the legal team defending Exxon in New York and New Jersey investigations of the oil spill that dumped 567,000 gallons of oil into Arthur Kill, New Jersey. The deal reached with the state of New Jersey allowed Exxon to plead guilty to a one-count federal misdemeanor and pay a fine over $10 million. Additionally, New York and New Jersey state prosecutors were prevented from seeking indictments and no action was to be taken against the four Exxon officers under investigation. He defended A. Alfred Taubman of Sotheby's, who was charged with conspiring to violate antitrust laws by engaging in price-fixing with rival Christie's. He also defended Sanjay Kumar of Computer Associates International, Inc. who was charged with securities fraud and obstruction of justice.

Education and honors 
Fiske is a past president of the American College of Trial Lawyers and the Federal Bar Council. He is a recipient of the Association Medal from the New York City Bar Association.

An alumnus of the Pomfret School he has a BA from Yale University (1952), and a JD from the University of Michigan (1955), where he was associate editor of the law review.

Personal life 
Fiske is the uncle of Gap brand CEO Neil Fiske.

References

External links

1930 births
Living people
Yale University alumni
University of Michigan Law School alumni
Politicians from New York City
New York (state) lawyers
United States Attorneys for the Southern District of New York
Whitewater controversy
Pomfret School alumni
Davis Polk & Wardwell lawyers
Special prosecutors